Mamadou Djikiné (born 16 May 1987) is a Malian - Portuguese professional footballer who plays as a defensive midfielder.

Club career
Born in Bamako, Djikiné spent all but his entire professional career in Portugal. In 2007 he signed with third division club S.C. Covilhã, playing 20 matches in his first season to help them promote as group champions and overall runners-up.

Djikiné made his debut in the Segunda Liga on 31 August 2008, featuring 90 minutes in the 4–3 home win against S.C. Olhanense. He scored his first goal in the competition the following 19 April, but also put one past his own net in a 1–1 away draw to Gil Vicente FC.

In the 2009 off-season, Djikiné joined Vitória de Setúbal. His maiden appearance in the Primeira Liga occurred on 17 August, when he played the entire 0–0 draw against Vitória de Guimarães at the Estádio do Bonfim. It was one of 25 during the campaign, to help his team finally avoid relegation as third-bottom.

Djikiné returned to Covilhã and the Portuguese second level in June 2014, after a spell in the Cypriot First Division. On 25 January 2015, he suffered a serious head injury after colliding with a teammate during a league fixture with Portimonense SC; he made a full recovery, going on to help the side as they fought for promotion until the end of the season, eventually finishing fourth level on points with the vice-champions.

Ahead of 2015–16, Djikiné agreed to a two-year contract at Atlético Clube de Portugal also of the second tier. On 10 August 2016, however, he returned to his previous club on a one-year deal.

References

External links

1987 births
Living people
21st-century Malian people
Sportspeople from Bamako
Malian footballers
Association football midfielders
Primeira Liga players
Liga Portugal 2 players
Segunda Divisão players
S.C. Covilhã players
Vitória F.C. players
Atlético Clube de Portugal players
Cypriot First Division players
Olympiakos Nicosia players
Malian expatriate footballers
Expatriate footballers in Portugal
Expatriate footballers in Cyprus
Expatriate footballers in Luxembourg
Malian expatriate sportspeople in Cyprus
Portuguese people of Malian descent